Hirose (written:  or ) is a Japanese surname. Notable people with the surname include:

 Akane Hirose, Japanese drummer (Band-Maid)
 Akihito Hirose, Japanese shogi player
 Akira Hirose, Japanese engineer
 Alice Hirose (born 1994), Japanese actress, TV personality, and model
 Ayakazu Hirose
, Japanese tennis player
 Gen Hirose (1904–1996)
, Japanese Paralympic judoka
, Japanese footballer
 Kenichi Hirose, one of the perpetrators of the Sarin gas attack on the Tokyo subway
 Kohmi Hirose (born 1966), Japanese pop singer and songwriter
, Japanese Paralympic judoka
Saihei Hirose (1828–1914), Japanese businessman
 Suzu Hirose (born 1998), Japanese actress and model
 Taka Hirose (born 1967), Japanese musician, member of Feeder
 Takashi Hirose (born 1943), Japanese writer
 Takashi "Halo" Hirose (died 2002), American swimmer
 Takeo Hirose (1868–1904), hero of the Russo-Japanese War
 Taro Hirose (born 1996), Canadian ice hockey player
, Japanese voice actor

Japanese-language surnames